"A Love-Tale of Alsace Lorraine" is a song published in 1928 by Spier and Coslow of New York City. J. Fred Coots and Lou Davis were credited as the composers and lyricists. The song was written for voice, piano, and ukulele. Artist Sydney Leff designed the cover art. On February 25, 1929, a version of the song was released by Victor Records. It was performed by Melody Three, a male vocal trio group.

The 1928 edition of the sheet music can be found at Pritzker Military Museum & Library.

References

1928 songs
Songs with music by John Frederick Coots
Songs written by Lou Davis